Dionigi is both a masculine Italian given name and a surname. Notable people with the name include:

Dionigi di Borgo San Sepolcro (c. 1300 – 1342), Augustinian monk
Dionigi Bussola (1615–1687), Italian sculptor
Dionigi Donnini (1681–1743), Italian painter
Dionigi Galletto (1932–2011), Italian mathematician
Dionigi da Palacenza Carli, 17th-century Capuchin missionary
Dionigi Tettamanzi (1934–2017), Italian cardinal
Dionigi Valesi (c.1730–c.1780), Italian printmaker
Davide Dionigi (born 1974), Italian footballer and manager

Italian-language surnames
Italian masculine given names